This article lists various team and individual football records in relation to the Lebanon national football team. The page currently shows the records as of 15 October 2019.

Team records

Wins

 Largest win 
 8–1 vs  on 6 May 2001
 7–0 vs  on 12 November 2015
 Largest away win 
 1–5 vs  on 4 December 1998
 Largest win at the Asian Cup 
 4–1 vs  on 17 January 2019

Draws
 Highest scoring draw 
 3–3 vs  on 17 October 1998 
 Highest scoring draw at the Asian Cup 
 2–2 vs  on 15 October 2000

Defeats

 Largest defeat 
 6–0 vs  on 3 July 2004
 6–0 vs  on 2 July 2011
 6–0 vs  on 2 September 2011
 Largest defeat at home  
 0–6 vs  on 2 July 2011
 Largest defeat at the Asian Cup 
 4–0 vs  on 12 October 2000

Streaks
 Unbeaten record  15 games, 2016–2018

World rankings

FIFA
Source: FIFA.com

 Highest FIFA ranking  77th (September 2018)
 Lowest FIFA ranking  178th (April – May 2011)

Below is a chart of Lebanon's FIFA ranking from 1992 to the present.

Elo
Source: Eloratings.net
 Highest Elo ranking  46th (April 1940)
 Lowest Elo ranking  164th (July 2011)

Appearances

General
 Most appearances 

. Highlighted names denote a player still playing or available for selection.

Goals

General
 First goal  Camille Cordahi vs  on 27 April 1940
 Most goals  Hassan Maatouk (2006–present), 21 goals

. Highlighted names denote a player still playing or available for selection.

Hat-tricks

On major tournaments

AFC Asian Cup

 Most goals in a single Asian Cup tournament  Hilal El-Helwe (in 2019), 2 goals
 Most goals in total at Asian Cup tournaments  Hilal El-Helwe (in 2019), 2 goals
 Most goals in a single Asian Cup finals match  Hilal El-Helwe, 2 goals vs  on 17 January 2019
 First goal in an Asian Cup finals match Abbas Chahrour, vs  on 15 October 2000

Captains

Footnotes

References

 
Records
National association football team records and statistics